The 1984 Llŷn Peninsula earthquake struck the Llŷn Peninsula in Gwynedd, northwest Wales on Thursday 19 July 1984 at 06:56 UTC (07:56 BST). Measuring 5.4 on the Richter scale, it is the largest onshore earthquake to occur in the UK since instrumental measurements began.

The effects were felt throughout Wales, most of England, and parts of Ireland and Scotland. There were many reports of minor damage to chimneys and masonry throughout Wales and England, the biggest concentration of damage being in Liverpool, which is located around 65 miles northeast of the epicentre. Minor injuries were also reported in the areas surrounding the epicentral area, and rockslides occurred at Tremadog in Gwynedd.

The 19 July earthquake was followed by many aftershocks in the following months, the largest measuring 4.3 on the Richter scale, which itself was felt as far away as Dublin, in Ireland.

See also
List of earthquakes in 1984
List of earthquakes in the British Isles

References

External links
Lleyn Penin, NW Wales – British Geological Survey

1984 Llŷn
Llyn
Llyn Peninsula earthquake
History of Gwynedd
Natural disasters in Wales
Environment of Gwynedd
July 1984 events in the United Kingdom
Geology of Gwynedd